The Eastern Qalamoun offensive was a large-scale military offensive against Syrian rebel positions in the eastern Qalamoun Mountains of the Rif Dimashq Governorate launched by the Islamic State of Iraq and the Levant along a frontline of more than 15 kilometers in the region.

The offensive
On 3 September 2016, ISIL sent two car bombs towards rebel positions in the mountains, but both were destroyed before they could reach their targets. Following this, ISIL forces stormed the rebel-held territory from three different axes, overrunning several positions and reportedly killing more than 20 rebels.

Three days later, an ISIL convoy was deployed as they launched a second assault in the area. During the clashes, the rebels destroyed an ISIL T-72, a bulldozer, and a ZU-23-2, the latter with a BGM-71 TOW missile. The next day, Jaysh al-Islam recaptured a hill near Dumayr from ISIL.

On 9 September, ISIL launched a third attack against rebel forces in the mountains. Rebels led by Jaysh al-Islam and various Free Syrian Army factions repelled the assault and dozens of ISIL fighters were killed. Hundreds of rebel reinforcements reportedly arrived in the region the next day. On 13 September, ISIL recaptured the three hilltops of Jabal Zubaydi, Tall Daba'a and Jabal al-Afa'i. On 14–15 September, rebels launched a counter-attack to regain Jabal al-Afa'i. On 17–18 September, ISIL forces launched a successful assault against rebel positions at Badiya, killing four and capturing forty defenders, while losing two vehicles in return. Heavy fighting between rebels and ISIL in the area was reported on 19 September, as the ISIL offensive entered its 3rd week.

On 21 September, Ahrar al-Sham and the Forces of Martyr Ahmad al-Abdo recaptured the Rajem al-A'ali area, giving them the control of 40% of the al-Afa'i Mountains, while a Syrian Air Force MiG-23 targeting ISIL crashed in the region. Rebel forces made further progress later that day, retaking several positions at Jebal Batra. The pilot of the crashed government jet landed in rebel territory in the mountains and as a result of a truce in the area, the rebels handed him over to the Syrian Armed Forces and reportedly received small arms and ammunition from government forces in return. By 23 September, the rebels were in control of 70% of Jabal al-Afa'i.

On 26 September, unknown gunmen attempted to assassinate Harith Siwar, commander of Jaysh al-Islam in the Eastern Qalamoun Mountains. On 29 September, ISIL forces launched a new attack in the eastern Qalamoun Mountains, leading to heavy clashes with the rebel defenders. In the night of 1–2 October, ISIL fighters stormed eastern Jabal al-Afa'i amid heavy fighting with FSA forces. Two days later, Jaysh al-Islam repelled another major ISIL attack on Jabal al-Afa'i and al-Naqab. On 9 October, 12 ISIL fighters and an unknown number of rebels were killed in clashes after an attack by ISIL on al-Khandaq and al-Naqab mountain. Five rebels were killed in clashes on the following day. On 15 October, rebels launched an assault on Kahil Tes and Mahol areas.

Aftermath

On 26 October, Syrian military bombarded areas under ISIL control in the region. On 2 November, clashes renewed between ISIL and rebels, concentrated in the area of Jabal al-Afa'i.

On 6 November, the rebels launched their own offensive, attacking ISIL positions. The rebels stated they had captured three checkpoints, with 7 ISIL fighters and 4 rebels being killed in the clashes. With the recent advances, rebels broke the siege imposed by ISIL on them in the region and had started advancing northwards to retake territory previously captured by the group.

On 29 December, FSA forces launched an offensive toward ISIL lines in the eastern Qalamoun and captured five villages.

See also
Al-Dumayr offensive (April 2016)

References

Conflicts in 2016
Damascus in the Syrian civil war
Military operations of the Syrian civil war in 2016
Military operations of the Syrian civil war involving the Islamic State of Iraq and the Levant
Military operations of the Syrian civil war involving the Syrian government
Military operations of the Syrian civil war involving the Free Syrian Army
Military operations of the Syrian civil war involving Jabhat Fateh al-Sham
September 2016 events in Syria
October 2016 events in Syria